Group 2 of the UEFA Euro 1972 qualifying tournament was one of the eight groups to decide which teams would qualify for the UEFA Euro 1972 finals tournament. Group 2 consisted of four teams: Hungary, Bulgaria, France, and Norway, where they played against each other home-and-away in a round-robin format. The group winners were Hungary, who finished two points above Bulgaria and France.

Final table

Matches

Goalscorers

References
 
 
 

Group 2
1970–71 in Hungarian football
1971–72 in Hungarian football
1970–71 in Bulgarian football
1971–72 in Bulgarian football
1970–71 in French football
1971–72 in French football
1970 in Norwegian football
1971 in Norwegian football
Hungary at UEFA Euro 1972